Furnace Hills Tenant House, also known as Kurtz House and Foxfire House, is a historic home located at West Cocalico Township, Lancaster County, Pennsylvania. It is a 1 1/2 to -story, banked sandstone dwelling, built c. 1830–1850.  It is considered to be in a vernacular Pennsylvania German perpendicular bankhouse style.  It measures 19 feet wide and 26 feet deep and has a gable roof.  Also on the property is a contributing stone stable, also built c. 1830–1850.  The stable has a frame barn addition built in the 1930s.

It was listed on the National Register of Historic Places in 2005.

References

Houses on the National Register of Historic Places in Pennsylvania
Houses completed in 1850
Houses in Lancaster County, Pennsylvania
Pennsylvania Dutch culture
National Register of Historic Places in Lancaster County, Pennsylvania